Charles N. ("Chip") Kahn III (born 1952 in New Orleans, Louisiana) is the president and chief executive officer of the Federation of American Hospitals (FAH), whose member companies own nearly 20 percent of all American hospital beds. Kahn and the FAH represent their members on health policy issues like health care reform and hospital care quality improvement.

Early life
Kahn was born and grew up in a Jewish family in New Orleans, Louisiana. His father, Charles N. Kahn Jr., is a retired engineer and his mother, Felicia Kahn, is active in local and state politics. He received a Bachelor of Arts degree in social and behavioral sciences from The Johns Hopkins University, and a Master of Public Health degree from Tulane University School of Public Health and Tropical Medicine.

After graduating Kahn completed an administrative residency with the Teaching Hospital Department of the Association of American Medical Colleges. He then served as the director at the Office of Financial Management Education at the Association of University Programs in Health Administration. Afterwards he served as a senior health policy advisor to former senator David Durenberger (R-MN) and as legislative assistant for health to then-senator Dan Quayle (R-IN).

Political campaigning
Kahn's political campaign experience began as a high school student when he first met and worked for Newt Gingrich, then a Tulane University graduate student, and the Louisiana campaign director for the presidential campaign of Governor Nelson A. Rockefeller (R-NY). In 1969, Kahn served in what became the successful campaign for Maurice Edwin ("Moon") Landrieu, elected in 1970 as Mayor of New Orleans, and worked in Mayor Landrieu's Administration in 1975. In 1974 and 1976, Kahn managed Gingrich's first two campaigns for the U.S. House of Representatives.

Congressional support
From 1986 to 1993 and from 1995 to 1998, Kahn served the Health Subcommittee of the United States House of Representatives’ Ways and Means Committee, first as Minority Health Counsel and then as Staff Director. During this time he helped develop legislation such as the Health Insurance Portability and Accountability Act of 1996 (HIPAA) and the Balanced Budget Act of 1997. From 1993 to 1995 and from 1998 to 2001, Kahn held positions with the Health Insurance Association of America (HIAA), as Executive Vice President, Chief Operating Officer/President-Designate and President.

Health reform debates
During the Obama Administration's 2009–2010 health reform initiative, Kahn, as President and CEO of the Federation of American Hospitals, worked with leaders of the American Hospital Association and the Catholic Health Association of the United States in creating a hospital industry agreement with congressional leaders and the administration. The agreement played a role in the passage and enactment of the Patient Protection and Affordable Care Act of 2010 (42 USC 18001). During the Clinton administration's 1993–1994 health reform initiative, Kahn was responsible for the Health Insurance Association of America’s "Harry and Louise" $14–20 million advertising/public affairs campaign, which influenced the national debate by opposing President Clinton’s healthcare proposal.

Today
Kahn is currently the co-chair on the strategy-setting Coordinating Committee of the NQF's Measure Applications Partnership, which was established under the Affordable Care Act to advise the federal Department of Health and Human Services on selecting measures for public reporting and performance-based healthcare payment programs.  Additionally, he has served as a member of the Governing Board of the National Quality Forum (NQF), where he helps build consensus on national priorities for healthcare quality reform and the standards for measuring and reporting on quality.

Kahn also is a founding principal of the Hospital Quality Alliance (HQA), a private–public partnership that he helped to initiate. The HQA is a national private–public collaboration focused on improving hospital quality and making comparative quality information available to the public through the Hospital Compare website.

Recognition
Becker’s Hospital Review named Kahn one of the top 10 most powerful people to know in healthcare and he is one of only four people who have appeared every year on what now is known as Modern Healthcare magazine’s annual "100 Most Influential People in Healthcare" list, since its inception. The Hill newspaper has listed Kahn as one of Washington, D.C.’s top lobbyists for 16 consecutive years and wrote about Kahn in 2016 – "A force in healthcare policy for three decades, Kahn is steering for-profit hospitals through the rapid delivery system reform pushed by the Obama administration.".

Kahn also received the prestigious B’nai B’rith 2016 National Health Care Award, which has recognized exceptional trailblazers in the health care industry for more than 30 years.

“Chip Kahn has used his leadership in the health care industry to help Americans get the hospital care they desperately need. Throughout his long career, Chip has played a key role in health care reform,” B'nai B'rith International President Gary P. Saltzman said.

In 2001, Tulane University's School of Public Health and Tropical Medicine awarded Kahn its "Champion of Public Health Award," and Tulane University's Department of Health Systems Management recognized him as one of its "most important alumni."

References

External links
 FAH Federation of American Hospitals website
 Hospital Quality Alliance website
 Hospital Compare website

External links

1952 births
Living people
Businesspeople from New Orleans
American health care chief executives
Johns Hopkins University alumni
Tulane University School of Public Health and Tropical Medicine alumni
20th-century American Jews
21st-century American Jews